Beatrice of Castile, Queen of Portugal may refer to:
Beatrice of Castile (1242–1303)
Beatrice of Castile (1293–1359)